β-Nitrostyrene is an aromatic compound and a nitroalkene used in the synthesis of indigo dye and the slimicide bromo-nitrostyrene.

Applications
β-Nitrostyrene is a chemical precursor for slimicides and dyes. Specifically bromo-nitrostyrene is obtained upon treatment with bromine followed by partial dehydrohalogenation while 2-nitrobenzaldehyde is obtained by treatment with ozone respectively.

Many of the syntheses of psychedelic substituted phenethylamines and substituted amphetamines described by Alexander Shulgin in his book PiHKAL use substituted nitrostyrenes as precursors. They are the final precursor, reduced with lithium aluminium hydride to the final product (an amine).

Chemical synthesis
The chemical is produced by either the Henry reaction of benzaldehyde and nitromethane or by direct nitration of styrene using nitric oxide.

References

Alkene derivatives
Nitro compounds
Phenyl compounds
Fungicides